Alexandre Noël Charles Acloque (1871–1941) was a French botanist who was an expert in lichens. Acloque was broadly interested in natural history and wrote books on the flora and fauna (insects) of France.

Selected works 

 Les Champignons (mushrooms), 1892
 Les Lichens (lichens), 1893
 Flore de France [A Flora of France], 1894
 Faune de France [A Fauna of France], 1896–1900)
 Mammifères (mammals)
 Oiseaux (birds)
 Poissons, Reptiles, Batraciens, Protochordés [Fish, Reptiles, Amphibians, Protochordats], 1 vol., in-18 de 210 p., with 294 figures
 Coléoptères (beetles), 1 vol., in-18 de 466 p., with 1052 figures
 Les insectes nuisibles [Insect Pests], 1897
 Scènes de la vie des insectes [Scenes from the Life of Insects], 1897
 Flores régionales de France [Regional Floras of France], including the French Alps, the Pyrénées, Alsace-Lorraine, the Mediterranean, western France, and Paris

References

Botanists with author abbreviations
1871 births
1941 deaths
20th-century French botanists
19th-century French botanists
French lichenologists